Sulaco is a municipality in the Honduran department of Yoro.

Demographics
At the time of the 2013 Honduras census, Sulaco municipality had a population of 17,509. Of these, 99.09% were Mestizo, 0.61% White, 0.17% Indigenous and 0.14% Black or Afro-Honduran.

References

Municipalities of the Yoro Department